The Limbaugh family is a prominent political family from Missouri. Its members have served as attorneys, politicians, judges, and political commentators in Missouri and the United States. The most well-known member is former conservative talk radio host Rush Limbaugh. The first family member in America, Georg Friedrich Limbach was born in Germany circa 1737 and immigrated to the United States, arriving in 1753 to Berks County, Pennsylvania as a young man. In 1758, George married Anna Catharine Ritter and had six sons. George settled in Missouri Territory in 1800 with his youngest son Michael and 19 other families. The family developed ties to Cape Girardeau, Missouri, and served in a number of municipal capacities, including the governance of Southeast Missouri State University. 

Rush Hudson Limbaugh Sr. (1891–1996), American legislator and ambassador; state legislator 1931–1932; Missouri Counsel for the War Emergency Pipelines, 1942–1946; President of the Missouri Bar, 1955–1956; President of the State Historical Society of Missouri, 1956–1959; chairman of the Cape Girardeau Republican Committee, 1928–1938
Stephen N. Limbaugh Sr., (b. 1927), son of Rush Sr., a retired United States District Court judge for the Eastern and Western districts of Missouri, 1983–2008; also served as Cape Girardeau County prosecuting attorney, 1955–1958.  He was married to Anne M. Limbaugh, (1950–2017), Cape Girardeau community service leader.
Rush Hudson Limbaugh III (1951–2021), American political commentator and host of The Rush Limbaugh Show. Grandson of Rush Sr., brother of David.
David Limbaugh (b. 1952), American political commentator, attorney and author. Grandson of Rush Sr., brother of Rush III.
Stephen N. Limbaugh Jr., (b. 1952), United States District Court judge for the Eastern District of Missouri, 2008–present; former justice of the Supreme Court of Missouri, 1992–2008, chief justice, 2001–2003. He also served as Cape Girardeau County Prosecuting Attorney, 1979–1982. Son of Stephen Sr., cousin to David and Rush III and grandson of Rush Sr.

References

 
American families of German ancestry
People from Cape Girardeau, Missouri
Political families of the United States
Families from Missouri